Junior Madut (born 26 March 1997), also sometimes referred to as Deng Junior Ring, is a South Sudanese-Australian professional basketball player for the Norths Bears of the NBL1 East. He is also contracted with the South East Melbourne Phoenix of the National Basketball League (NBL) and plays for the South Sudan national team.

Early life
Madut was born in Juba, South Sudan, and grew up in the Sydney suburb of Blacktown.

Madut attended Wyndham College in Sydney and then DME Academy in Daytona, Florida.

College career
Between 2017 and 2019, Madut played college basketball for Eastern Florida State College. After redshirting the 2019–20 season, he played for the Hawaii Rainbow Warriors in the 2020–21 and 2021–22 seasons.

Professional career
On 9 June 2022, Madut signed with the South East Melbourne Phoenix of the Australian National Basketball League on a two-year deal with a team option for the second year.

In February 2023, Madut joined the Norths Bears for the 2023 NBL1 East season.

National team career
In 2021, Madut debuted for the South Sudan national basketball team at AfroBasket 2021.

References

External links
NBL profile
Hawaii Rainbow Warriors college bio

1997 births
Living people
Australian men's basketball players
Hawaii Rainbow Warriors basketball players
Basketball players from Sydney
Shooting guards
South East Melbourne Phoenix players
South Sudanese men's basketball players